The Battle of Tomaszów Lubelski took place from 18 September to 20 September 1939 near the town of Tomaszów Lubelski. It was the second largest battle of the Invasion of Poland (Battle of Bzura was the largest) and also the largest tank battle of the campaign. It resulted in the surrender of Army Krakow  on 20 September 1939.

The battle can be divided into two phases - from 19 to 20 September and from 21 to 26 September. They are often referred to in French sources as the First and Second battle of Tomaszów, respectively.

First phase 

 
In the first phase (also known as the First Battle of Tomaszów Lubelski), Polish forces, composed of Army Lublin and Army Krakow under general Piskor attempted to break through the German positions around Tomaszów towards the Romanian Bridgehead area. Both armies forces on 15 September in the area southwest of Frampol. Their road towards south was blocked, however, by two German corps - VIII Army Corps (around Biłgoraj), and by XXII Panzer Corps, consisting of 2nd Panzer Division and 4th Light Division (around Hrubieszów, Zamość and Tomaszów Lubelski). Polish forces, concentrated around Frampol, were surrounded by six to seven German divisions. Since neither Army Kraków, nor Army Lublin had any aircraft, general Antoni Szylling, commander of Army Kraków, decided to risk and attack the Germans, without knowing their real strength. He knew that Panzer forces had already approached Rawa Ruska, and hoped that their units would be stretched along the road from Jarosław to Rawa. Polish forces included one of the largest Polish armored units of that time, the Warsaw Armoured Motorized Brigade, and Szyling, together with general Piskor, decided that the Warsaw Brigade would make a demonstration attack on Tomaszów, drawing the attention of the Germans. Joined Polish forces were made of five infantry divisions - 3rd, 21st, 22nd, 23rd, and 55th. Furthermore, they consisted of 1st Mountain Brigade, Kraków Cavalry Brigade, and Warsaw Armoured Motorized Brigade. However, after days of heavy fighting, Polish units were reduced to 30-50% of their original strength (except for the Armoured Brigade), lacking batteries, antitank ammunition and controllers. Furthermore, communication between separate divisions was strong, and they had no lots of support, which was a huge advantage, as they had an idea about movements and location of German forces.

These plans, however, were quickly changed, after the Germans destroyed key Polish unit, 21st Mountain Division near the village of Dzikowiec, on 15-16 September, killing general Józef Kustroń. General Piskor, realizing that German forces were stronger than he had thought, decided to act quickly, without waiting for all his divisions to concentrate. On 17 September he ordered Warsaw Armoured Motorized Brigade to attack Tomaszów and keep the town until main forces of Army Kraków joined the brigade. Tomaszów was attacked on 18 September in the morning, and by 1 p.m. half of the town was in Polish hands. Meanwhile, however, 4th Light Division joined the battle, striking rear Polish units and forcing them to withdraw. Thus, the attempt to capture Tomaszów in a surprise attack, failed. On the night of 18-19 September Warsaw Brigade, supported by infantry of 23rd and 55th divisions, attacked Tomaszów again, but without success. Third attack took place in the night of 19-20 September but Polish units were disorganized and demoralized. After a series of chaotic skirmishes, with number of killed and wounded growing, and ammunition shrinking, general Piskor decided to surrender. Some 11,000 Polish soldiers were captured, with small groups managing to hide in forests.

Meanwhile, Operational Group "Boruta" (named after General Mieczysław Boruta-Spiechowicz), which was part of Army Kraków, separated from main Polish forces and marched towards Narol. Surrounded by Germans, Polish units were destroyed one by one. Some managed to reach the area of Rawa Ruska, where 3,000 soldiers surrendered on 20 September, ending this phase of the battle.

Second phase 

The second phase (also known as the Second Battle of Tomaszów Lubelski) involved Polish units from the so-called Northern Front - remaining elements of Army Lublin, Army Modlin and Operational Groups Wyszków, Narew and Nowogródzka Cavalry Brigade under generals Emil Krukowicz-Przedrzymirski and Stefan Dąb-Biernacki. On 20 September these forces were some 40 kilometers north of Tomaszów, in the area of Sitaniec. General Dąb-Biernacki, who commanded them, until the final hours had no idea about the ongoing battle and did not help fighting troops. At the same time, general Piskor did not know about Dąb-Biernacki's units operating northeast of Tomaszów. Altogether, forces of Northern Front had 39,000 soldiers and 225 cannons. They were divided into three groups - Cavalry of general Władysław Anders, Operational Group of general Jan Kruszewski, and Operational Group of general Emil Krukowicz-Przedrzymirski. Polish forces were no match to German 10th Army and 14th Army, guarding the roads to the south, but general Dąb-Biernacki, at a meeting of his officers on 18 September in the village of Wereszcze Duże near Chełm, decided to go along with an attempt to break to Hungary or Romania. Dąb-Biernacki already knew that the Red Army had invaded Poland the day before, so time was of crucial importance.

Northern Front forces marched southwards from the area of Chełm in two columns, towards Zamość, which Dąb-Biernacki decided to attack. On 18 September Poles attacked Krasnystaw, but failed to capture it. On next day, Dąb-Biernacki ordered the attack on Zamość to be carried out on 20 September but on the night of 19-20 September he found out about the ongoing battle of Tomaszów Lubelski and decided to help. Northern Front units headed towards Tomaszów, but on 20 September, in the evening, they were attacked by 4th Light Division and 27th Infantry Division near Cześniki. Meanwhile, units of Operational Group of general Emil Krukowicz-Przedrzymirski reached the area of Tomaszów, and on 21 September, a few hours the first phase of the battle had ended, attacked troops under command of general Ernst Busch (28th Jäger Division and 8th Jäger Division). Since Polish forces proved to be stronger than expected, field marshal Wilhelm List decided to send reinforcements to general Busch - 68th Infantry Division, 27th I.D., and 2nd Panzer Division, which had just mopped Polish forces in the first phase of the battle of Tomaszów Lubelski.

In the evening of 22 September cavalry of general Władysław Anders attacked, capturing Krasnystaw, and then reaching Sambor. Other Polish units were not successful, and in several skirmishes were surrounded on 23 September. General Dąb-Biernacki ordered his officers to capitulate, escaped the encirclement, and left Poland, ending up in France. General Przedrzymirski refused to obey the order, and on 24 September attacked Krasnobród, but then was stopped by 8th Jager Division. Most of the remaining Polish forces capitulated around 26 September.

Order of Battle

See also 

 List of World War II military equipment of Poland
 List of German military equipment of World War II

References

External links

Tomaszow Lubelski
Lublin Voivodeship (1919–1939)
September 1939 events